Hallunda Church is a church building in Hallunda, Botkyrka, Sweden.

References 

Churches in Stockholm